Birresborn is an Ortsgemeinde – a municipality belonging to a Verbandsgemeinde, a kind of collective municipality – in the Vulkaneifel district in Rhineland-Palatinate, Germany. It belongs to the Verbandsgemeinde of Gerolstein, whose seat is in the like-named town.

Geography

Location 
The municipality lies roughly 6 km south of Gerolstein at an elevation of 350 m above sea level in the Kyll valley in the Vulkaneifel, a part of the Eifel known for its volcanic history, geographical and geological features, and even ongoing activity today, including gases that sometimes well up from the earth.

Constituent communities 
Birresborn's Ortsteile are Sauerwasser, the hunting lodge Waldfries and the outlying centre of Rom.

Neighbouring municipalities 
Clockwise from the north, these are Gerolstein (7 km away), Michelbach (outlying centre of Gerolstein; 4 km away), Salm (8 km away), Mürlenbach (4 km away), Kopp (4 km away) and Büdesheim (9 km away).

Mountains 
Loftier peaks in the municipality include the Rödelkaul (592 m), the Daxberg (548 m), the Goldberg (523 m) and the Vulkan Kalem (509.4 m).

Streams 
Kyll
Fischbach
Schlemmbach

Mineral springs

Adonis Quelle 
The Adonis Quelle – Quelle is German for “spring” – lies in the middle of the village, but has been closed since November 2003 owing to contamination. The Quelltempel (“Spring Temple”) also found here near the bridge on the Kyll, in which one could once drink water from the Adonis Quelle and draw it for one's own use, has likewise been closed ever since.

Lindenquelle 
The Lindenquelle lies roughly 4 km north of Birresborn on the way to Gerolstein. The Quelltempel still standing here is under monumental protection, and since 3 July 2009, has been being restored. Moreover, the mineral water is once more gushing forth. The contamination that ended the Adonis Quelle’s usefulness has not affected the Lindenquelle. Here, one can drink water free of charge and also fill up on it the year round.

Conservation areas 
Nature conservation areas exist at the Vulkan Kalem, at the ice caves and in the Fischbach valley, in the Felst and in the Hundsbach valley.

History 
In 721, Birresborn had its first documentary mention under the name Birgisburias. The prefix Bir— is a word of Semitic origin. It means “well” or “watering place”. Commonly, however, Birgis-burias is translated as “Good Well”.

On 15 June 1871, Birresborn was linked to the German railway network with the opening of the Eifelbahn between Gerolstein and Trier. On 14 May 1908, the Lindenquelle was acknowledged as a public utility. On 20 February 1914, the municipality's springs were recognized by the state as health springs. On Christmas Day 1944, not long before the Second World War ended, a great part of Birresborn was destroyed in an Allied air raid. Since 1971, Birresborn has been part of the Verbandsgemeinde of Gerolstein, in the Daun district, which is now known as the Vulkaneifel district. On 11 November 2003, the mineral spring Birresborner Phönix Sprudel was closed owing to contamination. On 24 May 2009, the municipality celebrated an “Historic Village Festival” with more than 3,500 visitors from Germany and abroad.

Politics

Municipal council 
The council is made up of 16 council members, who were elected by proportional representation at the municipal election held on 7 June 2009, and the honorary mayor as chairman.

The municipal election held on 7 June 2009 yielded the following results:

Mayors 
 29 November 1952 - 9 June 1970 Josef Stadtfeld
 10 June 1970 - 9 October 1970 Peter Wirtz (resigned)
 9 October 1970 - 22 October 1970 Hans Heinen (as first deputy after Wirtz's resignation)
 23 October 1970 - 30 November 1982 Anton Karls
 1 December 1982 - 2009 Josef Bach
 2009–2014 Michael Zander
 2014–2019 Gordon Schnieder
 since 2019 Christiane Stahl

Coat of arms 
The municipality's arms might be described thus: Azure in base a mount of three argent charged with and oakleaf in bend sinister vert, above which a spring with four streams of the second.

Culture and sightseeing

Natural monuments 
Ice caves, millstone quarries
Adam & Eva, two pinetrees over 200 years old
Lindenquelle

Buildings 
 Saint Nicholas's Catholic Church (Kirche St. Nikolaus), Kopper Straße 2, Classicist east tower from 1828, warriors’ memorial 1860, 1870/1871, 1914/1918, pillar with figure of the Archangel Michael on pedestal with relief.
 Bahnhofstraße 10 – Classicist house from 1849
 Bahnhofstraße 14 – house from 1899
 Fischbachstraße 6 – estate complex, 19th century, house with knee wall, former cottage/bakehouse, somewhat more recent (?) long commercial building
 Fischbachstraße 18 – plaster building, partly faced, “oven porch”
 Gerolsteiner Straße 21  – Quereinhaus (a combination residential and commercial house divided for these two purposes down the middle, perpendicularly to the street) from 1873
 Gerolsteiner Straße 17, 19, 21 (monument zone) – an unbroken row of two estates parallel to the street and one Quereinhaus (see above), all with eaves facing the street, built in the latter half of the 19th century on the village's northern outskirts, plain houses with right-angled wrought-stone edging, characteristic street design of a 19th-century village expansion.
 Grabenstraße 3 – house from 1846
 Mürlenbacher Straße/corner of Grabenstraße – sandstone wayside cross from 1684
 Rheinische Basalt- u. Lavawerke: Werk Birresborn, old stoneworking factory
 Salmer Straße – sandstone wayside cross from the latter half of the 18th century
 Lindenquelle spring pavilion, north of the village on the road to Lissingen, apparently from 1834
 Wayside cross northwest of the village near Kreisstraße 77

Economy and infrastructure

Transport

Rail 
The halt at Birresborn lies on the Eifelbahn (Cologne–Euskirchen–Gerolstein–Trier), which here is served by local public rail service between Gerolstein and Trier.

All local public transport is integrated into the Verkehrsverbund Region Trier (VRT), whose fares therefore apply.

Road 
Birresborn lies right on Landesstraße 24.

The nearest Autobahnen are as follows:
A 1 (towards Cologne) roughly 50 km to the north;
A 48 (towards Koblenz) roughly 30 km to the west;
A 60 (towards Wittlich) roughly 25 km to the south.

Education 
Birresborn's only school is the Grundschule Birresborn, a primary school for year grades 1 to 4.

Church 

Birresborn is a community whose inhabitants are mainly Catholic. Belonging to the parish of St. Nikolaus Birresborn are also the communities of St. Matthias Kopp, St.Lucia Mürlenbach and Maria Magdalena Densborn. The parish belongs to the Diocese of Trier.

Parish priests 
The late Helmut Bauerschmitz
Gerhard Schwan

Famous people

Honorary citizens 
 Dr. Peter Peters (b. 1924, d. 23 July 2009)

References

External links 

Municipality’s official webpage 
 Birgisburias in Carasco - Ortsname und Siedlungsanfänge von Birresborn 

Vulkaneifel